The Tunisia national football team has played teams from every confederation. Their first international match was played on 2 June 1957 in Tunis against Libya, winning 4–2. The team they have played the most is Morocco, with a total of 50 matches played.

Their biggest win has been by 8 goals in two matches: against Chinese Taipei on 18 August 1960, and against Djibouti on 12 June 2015.

Player records 

Players in bold are still active with Tunisia.

Most appearances

Top goalscorers

All−time record against FIFA recognized nations
The list shown below shows the Tunisia national football team all−time international record against opposing nations.

Key

Teams yet to play against Tunisia

Match statistics

Biggest wins

Hat-tricks

Notes

References 

Tunisia national football team records and statistics
National association football team records and statistics